Mordellistena wittei is a species of beetle in the genus Mordellistena of the family Mordellidae, described by Maurice Pic in 1950.

References

External links
Coleoptera. BugGuide.

Beetles described in 1954
wittei